Down Colorful Hill is the debut studio album by American slowcore band Red House Painters, released on September 14, 1992 by the record label 4AD.

Background 

As was done with the debuts of previous 4AD artists like Pixies, Lush, and His Name Is Alive, the album is made up of demos that were slightly remixed for general release. In Martin Aston's book Facing the Other Way: The Story of 4AD, Mark Kozelek expressed regret over the reverb- and echo-heavy mixing techniques he employed. The song "Waterkill", which dates from the same sessions but not included here, later appeared on the compilation Retrospective in un-remixed form, giving listeners an idea of the original demos' rawer sound.

A music video was produced for the song "24", directed by Mark Taylor.

The cover artwork for Down Colorful Hill is by Welsh photographer Simon Larbalestier entitled "Bed".

Reception 

Down Colorful Hill has generally been well received by critics.

AllMusic wrote "the group has already reached full maturity; these lengthy, ponderous songs are remarkably evocative portraits of a distinctly tortured psyche – Mark Kozelek forgoes the camouflage of metaphor to lay his soul on the line, and the honesty of his craft is both beautiful and disturbing". Stereogum wrote in a 2012 article that the album "sounds dated and immature; the work of a nascent artist who didn't trust his own voice, didn't know his way around a studio and wasn't entirely confident on the guitar. [...] But good lord, what an album."

Track listing

Release history

References

External links 
 

Red House Painters albums
1992 debut albums
4AD albums
Albums produced by Mark Kozelek